The 2000 NCAA Division I men's lacrosse tournament was the 30th annual Division I NCAA Men's Lacrosse Championship tournament. Twelve NCAA Division I college men's lacrosse teams met after having played their way through a regular season, and for some, a conference tournament.

The championship game was played at Maryland's Byrd Stadium in front of 24,105 fans,  The game saw the Syracuse University defeat Princeton University by the score of 13–7.  This marks the 7th victory in a national championship game for the Syracuse program.

Tournament bracket

 * = Overtime

All-Tournament Team
Liam Banks, Syracuse (Named the tournament's Most Outstanding Player)
Rob Mulligan, Syracuse
Ryan Powell, Syracuse
Marshall Abrams, Syracuse
John Glatzel, Syracuse
Josh Sims, Princeton
Sean Hartofilis, Princeton
Ryan Curtis, Virginia
Conor Gill, Virginia
A.J. Haugen, Johns Hopkins

See also
2000 NCAA Division I Women's Lacrosse Championship
2000 NCAA Division II Lacrosse Championship
2000 NCAA Division III Men's Lacrosse Championship

Footnotes

References 

NCAA Division I Men's Lacrosse Championship
NCAA Division I Men's Lacrosse Championship
NCAA Division I Men's lacrosse
NCAA Division I Men's lacrosse